Philip Andrew Brimmer (born March 15, 1959) is the Chief United States district judge of the United States District Court for the District of Colorado. He is the son of Clarence Addison Brimmer Jr., a former federal judge in Wyoming.

Education and career

Born in Rawlins, Wyoming, Brimmer received an Artium Baccalaureus degree from Harvard College in 1981 and a Juris Doctor from Yale Law School in 1985. He was a law clerk for Judge Zita Leeson Weinshienk of the United States District Court for the District of Colorado from 1985 to 1987. He was in private practice in Colorado from 1987 to 1994, and then served as a deputy district attorney in the Denver District Attorney's Office from 1994 to 2001, briefly serving as its chief deputy district attorney  in 2001. He became an Assistant United States Attorney for the District of Colorado in 2001, becoming chief of the major crimes section in 2006, and served as chief of the special prosecutions section from 2006 to 2008.

Federal judicial service

On July 10, 2008, Brimmer was nominated by President George W. Bush to a seat on the United States District Court for the District of Colorado vacated by Lewis Babcock. Brimmer was confirmed by the United States Senate on September 26, 2008, and received his commission on October 14, 2008. He became Chief Judge on March 3, 2019.

References

External links

1959 births
Living people
Assistant United States Attorneys
Colorado Republicans
Harvard College alumni
Judges of the United States District Court for the District of Colorado
People from Rawlins, Wyoming
United States district court judges appointed by George W. Bush
21st-century American judges
Yale Law School alumni